Windsor, also known as New Windsor, is a village in Rivoli Township, Mercer County, Illinois, United States. The population was 668 at the 2020 census, down from 748 in 2010. The official name is the "Village of Windsor", but "New Windsor" is the commonly used name, including by the New Windsor Fire Department and the US Postal Service (ZIP Code 61465).

Geography
New Windsor is located on the eastern edge of Mercer County at  (41.201643, -90.443996). The eastern border of the village is also the Henry County line.

Illinois Route 17 passes through the village as its Main Street.

It sits on a low ridge that drains south to North Pope Creek and north to a tributary of Parker Run, which continues north to the Edwards River. Pope Creek and the Edwards are west-flowing direct tributaries of the Mississippi River.

Demographics

As of the census of 2000, there were 720 people, 307 households, and 217 families residing in the village. The racial makeup of the village was 98.75% White, 0.28% Native American, 0.28% Asian, and 0.69% from two or more races. Hispanic or Latino of any race were 2.50% of the population.

There were 307 households, out of which 28.7% had children under the age of 18 living with them, 59.6% were married couples living together, 6.8% had a female householder with no husband present, and 29.3% were non-families. 28.0% of all households were made up of individuals, and 18.9% had someone living alone who was 65 years of age or older. The average household size was 2.35 and the average family size was 2.82.

In the village, the population was spread out, with 22.1% under the age of 18, 8.9% from 18 to 24, 24.4% from 25 to 44, 25.4% from 45 to 64, and 19.2% who were 65 years of age or older. The median age was 41 years. For every 100 females, there were 97.3 males. For every 100 females age 18 and over, there were 92.1 males.

The median income for a household in the village was $37,500, and the median income for a family was $41,094. Males had a median income of $30,556 versus $18,594 for females. The per capita income for the village was $19,811. About 6.1% of families and 7.8% of the population were below the poverty line, including 7.0% of those under age 18 and 10.3% of those age 65 or over.

References

External links
New Windsor Illinois 

Villages in Mercer County, Illinois
Villages in Illinois